The Olympus OM-D E-M1 Mark II is a digital mirrorless interchangeable-lens camera released by Olympus Corporation in December 2016. It replaced the Olympus OM-D E-M1, which was introduced in 2013.

Features include 

 20 MP Live MOS sensor, manufactured by Sony.
 5-axis In-Body Image Stabilization
 High resolution mode: With the IBIS pixel shift technology, the camera can take a 50 MP image 
 Sensitivity range of ISO 100-25600.
 Dual SD card slots, one with UHS-II support.
 TruePic VIII processor.
 Silent mode: Only uses electronic shutter.
 121 phase detection auto focus points.
 Movie recording in DCI 4K (4096x2160), UHD 4K (3840x2160) or Full HD (1920x1080). 
 60 fps burst rate in silent mode.
 Micro Four Thirds lens mount.
 No built-in flash

 Weather sealed, magnesium alloy body.

 Electronic viewfinder with a 2,360,000 dots resolution.

Compared to the predecessor, Olympus OM-D E-M1 
The Olympus OM-D E-M1 Mark II was introduced 3 years after its official predecessor, the regular E-M1. The E-M1 lacks the High Resolution mode, and also the 4K movie recording feature, which the Mark II has. The Mark II only has phase detection AF points, the regular E-M1 has both contrast- and phase detection AF points, but it can only use one type at once. According to Olympus, the Mark II's autofocus is six times faster and also more accurate than its predecessor's. The older model only has one memory card slot, the Mark II has two, and it supports UHS-II also, unlike the E-M1. The Mark II has a slightly larger and differently textured grip.

The E-M1 Mark II won "Camera of the Year" in the Camera Grand Prix 2017.

In January 2019, Olympus announced its new flagship Olympus OM-D E-M1X, which is intended for professional use.

In February 2020, Olympus announced the OM-D E-M1 Mark III, the successor to the E-M1 Mark II.

References

External links

 Official website
 Manufacturer website

OM-D E-M1 Mark II
Cameras introduced in 2016